James Archibald Christie (1873 – 16 October 1958) was a Conservative Party politician in the United Kingdom.  He was Member of Parliament (MP) for South Norfolk from 1924 until he retired from the House of Commons at the 1945 general election.

References

External links 
 

1873 births
1958 deaths
Conservative Party (UK) MPs for English constituencies
UK MPs 1924–1929
UK MPs 1929–1931
UK MPs 1931–1935
UK MPs 1935–1945